The Battle of Santa Clara was a series of events in late December 1958 that led to the capture of the Cuban city of Santa Clara by revolutionaries under the command of Che Guevara. 

The battle was a decisive victory for the rebels fighting against the regime of General Fulgencio Batista. Within 12 hours of the city's capture, Batista fled Cuba, and Fidel Castro's forces claimed overall victory.

The battle

Attack on the city 
Guevara's column traveled on 28 December 1958 from the coastal port of Caibarién along the road to the town of Camajuaní, which lay between Caibarién and Santa Clara. Their journey was received by cheering crowds of peasants, and Caibarién's capture within a day reinforced the sense among the rebel fighters that overall victory was imminent. Government troops guarding the army garrison at Camajuani deserted their posts without incident, and Guevara's column proceeded to Santa Clara. They arrived at the city's university on the outskirts of the town at dusk.

There, Guevara, who was wearing his arm in a sling after falling off a wall during the fighting in Caibarién, divided his forces, numbering about 300, into two columns. The southern column was the first to meet the defending army forces commanded by Colonel Casillas Lumpuy. An armoured train, sent by Batista to reinforce supplies of ammunition, weapons, and other equipment, traveled to the foot of the hill of Capiro, northeast of the city, establishing a command post there. Guevara dispatched his "suicide squad", a force under 23-year-old Roberto Rodríguez (known as "El Vaquerito"), to capture the hill. The defenders of the hill withdrew with surprising speed and the train, containing officers and soldiers from the command post, withdrew towards the centre of the town.

In the city itself, a series of skirmishes were taking place between government forces and the second rebel column, led by Rolando Cubela, with the assistance of civilians providing Molotov cocktails. Two army garrisons (the barracks of the Leoncio Vidal Regiment and the barracks of the 31 Regiment of the Rural Guard) were under siege from Cubela's forces despite army support from aircraft, snipers, and tanks.

Capture of the train

Guevara, who viewed the capture of the armoured train as a priority, successfully mobilized the tractors of the school of Agronomy at the university to raise the rails of the railway. The train was therefore derailed as it transported troops away from Capiro hill. The officers within tumbled out asking for a truce. At this, ordinary soldiers, whose morale was very low, began to fraternize with the rebels, saying that they were tired of fighting against their own people. Shortly afterward the armored train was in the hands of the rebels and its 350 men and officers were transported as prisoners.

The train contained a considerable amount of weaponry, a huge bonus to revolutionary forces, which would become a basis for the further attack in the hands of both the rebels and supportive peasants. Guevara himself described how the men were forced out by a volley of Molotov cocktails, causing the armored train to become a "veritable oven for the soldiers".

The capture of the train and the subsequent media broadcasts from both the government and the rebels proved to be a key tipping point in the revolution. Despite the next day's newspapers hailing Batista's "victory" at Santa Clara, contrary broadcasts from Castro's rebel forces accelerated the succession of army surrenders. The reports ended with the news that rebel leaders were heading "without let or hindrance" towards Havana to take over the government.

Nowadays the "Armored Train" is a national memorial and museum located near the depot of Santa Clara station.

Capture of the city
Most garrisons around the country quickly surrendered to the first guerrilla commander who showed up at their gate. In mid-afternoon, Che announced over Radio Rebelde that the last troops in Santa Clara had surrendered.

References and notes

External links

  Photographs of the Armored train surrender in Santa Clara by Latin American Studies
  The Battle of Santa Clara: The Legend of Che Guevara is Born by Christopher Minster
 A Front-Row Seat To Witness The Battle Of Santa Clara by Felipe Yanes, Tampa Tribune, January 25, 2009
Che's Last Stand by Ed Ewing, The Guardian, December 31, 2008
 An eye witness account by the president of Antillian College, a Seventh-day Adventist institution located across the road from the Central University. Brown tells of meeting Commander Che Guevara and the college's choir sang at a special ceremony held at the Central University with the new premier, Fidel Castro, in the audience.

Cuban Revolution
Che Guevara
1958 in Cuba
Conflicts in 1958
Santa Clara, Cuba